Warren Municipal Airport  is a city-owned, public-use airport located three nautical miles (6 km) south of the central business district of Warren, a city in Bradley County, Arkansas, United States. It is included in the National Plan of Integrated Airport Systems for 2011–2015, which categorized it as a general aviation facility.

Facilities and aircraft 
Warren Municipal Airport covers an area of 40 acres (16 ha) at an elevation of 235 feet (72 m) above mean sea level. It has one runway designated 3/21 with an asphalt surface measuring 3,829 by 75 feet (1,167 x 23 m).

For the 12-month period ending February 28, 2011, the airport had 3,300 aircraft operations, an average of 275 per month: 91% general aviation and 9% military. At that time there were 10 aircraft based at this airport: 80% single-engine, 10% multi-engine, and 10% ultralight.

References

External links 
 Warren Municipal Airport at Arkansas Department of Aeronautics
 Aerial image as of March 2001 from USGS The National Map
 
 
 

Airports in Arkansas
Transportation in Bradley County, Arkansas
Buildings and structures in Bradley County, Arkansas